Wenquan Area is an area and a town on the west of Haidian District, Beijing, China. It borders Xibeiwan Town in its east, Xiangshan Subdistrict in its southeast, Junzhuang Town in its southwest, and Sujiatuo Town in its west and north. The population was 69,165 as of 2020.

The name Wenquan refers to a hotspring in north of Tangzi Mountain within the region.

History

Administrative Divisions 
As of 2021, Wenquan Area consisted of 20 subdivisions, including 13 communities, 2 villages and 5 residential area:

See also 

 List of township-level divisions of Beijing

References 

Haidian District
Towns in Beijing
Areas of Beijing